Fiona Pennie (born 9 November 1982) is a British slalom canoeist who has competed internationally since 1997. She lives in Waltham Abbey in Essex.

Career
Pennie won a bronze medal at the Junior World Championships in 2000 and won the overall Junior World Cup Series in the same year. As an Under 23 athlete, she won a team bronze medal in 2004 and an individual bronze medal in 2005, both at the European Under 23 Championships. She competed in the K1 event at the 2008 and 2016 Olympics and placed 17th and 6th, respectively.

She won seven medals at the ICF Canoe Slalom World Championships with two golds (K1 team: 2019, 2021), three silvers (K1: 2006, 2014; K1 team: 2015) and two bronzes (K1 team: 2007, 2018). She became European Champion in the K1 (solo kayak class) event in 2013. She won a total of 8 medals (3 golds, 1 silver and 4 bronzes) at the European Championships.

World Cup individual podiums

1 World Championship counting for World Cup points

References

External links

1982 births
Alumni of Loughborough University
Scottish female canoeists
Canoeists at the 2008 Summer Olympics
Canoeists at the 2016 Summer Olympics
Living people
Olympic canoeists of Great Britain
People from Alexandria, West Dunbartonshire
People from Waltham Abbey, Essex
British female canoeists
Scottish LGBT sportspeople
Lesbian sportswomen
Medalists at the ICF Canoe Slalom World Championships
LGBT canoeists
Sportspeople from West Dunbartonshire